Alternatiba is a Basque socialist political party. Founded in 2009, Alternatiba was born as a critical tendency within Izquierda Unida (IU) in the Basque Country opposing a participation in the Basque government along with the PNV and Eusko Alkartasuna. In 2009 this tendency broke away from IU and formed an independent party.

See also

 Basque nationalism
 Batasuna
 EH Bildu

References

External links
 https://web.archive.org/web/20180708162258/http://alternatiba.net//

 
Basque conflict
Basque history
Far-left politics in Spain
Political parties established in 2011
Political parties in Northern Basque Country
Politics of Spain
Pro-independence parties
Secessionist organizations in Europe
Socialism
Socialist parties in the Basque Country (autonomous community)
Organisations based in Bilbao